The Way We Laughed (Italian language: Così ridevano) is a 1998 Italian film directed by Gianni Amelio. It tells the story of two Sicilian brothers, Giovanni and Pietro, who emigrate to the city of Turin. Giovanni works hard to help Pietro study to be a teacher, but Pietro does poorly. Then Pietro disappears.

The film won the Golden Lion at the Venice Film Festival.

Cast 
Enrico Lo Verso as Giovanni
Fabrizio Gifuni as Pelaia
Francesco Giuffrida as Pietro
Rosaria Danzè as Lucia
Renato Liprandi as the professor
Paolo Sena as Prof.Rosini

External links 
 

1998 films
1998 drama films
1990s Italian-language films
Golden Lion winners
Films directed by Gianni Amelio
Films set in Turin
Italian drama films
1990s Italian films